Su Zhiqian (born August 1955) is a vice-admiral (zhong jiang) of the People's Liberation Army Navy (PLAN) of China. He has served as commander of the East Sea Fleet and concurrently deputy commander of the Nanjing Military Region since 2010, and formerly served as commander of the South Sea Fleet and deputy commander of the Guangzhou Military Region.

Biography
Su Zhiqian was born in August 1955. He studied at the Military Academy of the General Staff of the Armed Forces of Russia, PLA Naval Command Academy, and PLA National Defence University (NDU). He was also a faculty member of NDU.

Su spent most of his career in the PLAN's South Sea Fleet, where he served as deputy chief of staff from 2000 to 2006, chief of staff from 2006 to 2007, deputy commander from 2007 to 2009, and in January 2009, he was promoted to commander of the South Sea Fleet and concurrently deputy commander of the Guangzhou Military Region. In December 2010, Su was transferred to the East Sea Fleet, serving as its commander and concurrently deputy commander of the Nanjing Military Region.

Su attained the rank of rear admiral in 2007 and vice-admiral in July 2010.

References

1955 births
Living people
PLA National Defence University alumni
Commanders of the East Sea Fleet
Deputy Chiefs of Staff of the South Sea Fleet
Commanders of the South Sea Fleet